Eriogonum libertini is a species of wild buckwheat known by the common name Dubakella Mountain buckwheat. This uncommon plant is endemic to California where it grows in the rocky serpentine terrain of the southern Klamath Mountains and nearby ranges.

It is named for the local peak Dubakella Mountain.

Description
This is a squat mountain plant forming leafy mats up to half a meter wide with spindly erect inflorescences up to 30 centimeters tall. The leaves are woolly and pale green to silver. The clusters of flowers atop the inflorescences are bright yellow.

External links
Jepson Manual Treatment — Eriogonum libertini
Eriogonum libertini — Photo gallery

libertini
Endemic flora of California
Flora of the Klamath Mountains
Natural history of the California Coast Ranges
Flora without expected TNC conservation status